Trump Plaza New Rochelle is a 40-story luxury condo building located in New Rochelle, NY. The Trump Organization no longer manages the property after its services were rescinded by the Condo Board in October 2021, and the building is now managed by AKAM Associates. 

Trump Plaza New Rochelle was built by Cappelli Enterprises, the same developer that built Trump Tower at City Center in nearby White Plains. Trump Plaza was the tallest building in Westchester County and the tallest building between New York City and Albany until the completion of the 44-story, twin-towered Ritz-Carlton hotel in White Plains.

Trump Plaza is part of a massive downtown redevelopment project that began with the construction of New Roc City in 1999. The project encompasses Parcel 1A and the Lawton Street Redevelopment block known as Le Count Square. In 2008 Cappelli Enterprises will begin development of 'Le Count Square' opposite Trump Plaza, adding  of hotel, office, retail and residential space to the area. With the development of Trump Plaza and LeCount Square, Cappelli's total investment in downtown New Rochelle will exceed $1 billion.
 
The retail portion of the project is linked to New Roc City by an enclosed pedestrian bridge.

Incidents
On September 17, 2019 a car plowed into the lobby of the building at around 8:40pm EST. 3 people were injured.

References

External links

Official Website for the Condominium
Trump Plaza New Rochelle Drumps Trump as Property Manager
Non-Official website maintained by The Trump Organization
Emporis.com Page

Skyscrapers in New York (state)
Buildings and structures in New Rochelle, New York
Residential skyscrapers in New York (state)
Assets owned by the Trump Organization